Attire Accessories is a trade publication and web site owned by KD Media Publishing Ltd. It is a business-to-business (B2B) magazine brand predominantly aimed at UK fashion retailers including independent fashion shops, jewellers, boutiques, shoe shops, bag shops, accessory shops and buyers in national fashion chains and department stores. Its editorial offices are in Witham, Essex UK and its editor is Laura Sutherland.

Attire Accessories provides industry professionals with detailed information on trade shows and reviews hundreds of new products. The magazine also offers advice on financial and legal matters, and providing trend forecasts.

Established in 2007, Attire Accessories magazine is published bi-monthly.

The online version of the magazine includes the current issue and previous issues, as well as features, polls, competitions, and updates on events.

References

External links
Attire Accessories magazine website

Bi-monthly magazines published in the United Kingdom
Business magazines published in the United Kingdom
Magazines established in 2007
Professional and trade magazines
Mass media in Essex
2007 establishments in the United Kingdom